John Michael Lee (born November 30, 1972) is an American television producer, writer, director, voice actor, and musician best known for his work on the MTV2 comedy series Wonder Showzen as a member of the rock band/art collective PFFR.

Career
Lee is long time friends with fellow PFFR member and television producer Vernon Chatman. They met as undergraduates at San Francisco State University. Along with Chatman, Lee is the co-creator, writer, director and star of Wonder Showzen. He voices Wordsworth, one of the main puppet characters and provides various other voices on the show. The pair also co-created Snoop Dogg's 2002 MTV sketch show Doggy Fizzle Televizzle. In addition, Lee is the co-creator of Xavier: Renegade Angel, also with Alyson Levy, Chatman and Jim Tozzi. He also worked as a creative consultant on the Adult Swim series Superjail! in 2009. In 2011, Lee, Levy and Chatman created the Adult Swim mini-series The Heart, She Holler starring Patton Oswalt and Kristen Schaal.

Lee was a member of the now defunct rock trio Muckafurgason. Although his primary role in the band was the bassist, the members of Muckafurgason were often known to "play musical chairs" with their instruments, seeing Lee occasionally turn his hand to lead vocals, guitar and even clarinet. Through Muckafurgason he became acquainted with the band They Might Be Giants, who wrote the song "John Lee Supertaster" about him.

Lee was the director and executive producer of the Adult Swim series Delocated and Neon Joe: Werewolf Hunter season 2 starring Jon Glaser. In 2011, Lee began directing segments for the Comedy Central series Jon Benjamin Has a Van. He also directed the pilot of Inside Amy Schumer and several episodes of Broad City.

Lee's directorial debut was the 2016 Pee-wee Herman comedy film Pee-wee's Big Holiday. He later directed the 2021 horror film False Positive.

References

External links

American male comedians
21st-century American comedians
American comedy musicians
American music video directors
American male television actors
American television directors
American television producers
American television writers
American male television writers
PFFR
American male voice actors
1972 births
Living people
Date of birth missing (living people)
Place of birth missing (living people)
San Francisco State University alumni